Iron fluoride may refer to:

Iron(II) fluoride (ferrous fluoride, FeF2), a white solid
 (Fe2F5)
Iron(III) fluoride (ferric fluoride, FeF3), a pale green solid

Iron compounds